Statistics of Division 2 in the 1933–34 season.

Overview
It was contested by 23 teams, and Red Star Paris and Olympique Alès won the championship.

League tables

Group North

Group South

External links
French Division 2 - List of Final Tables at Rec.Sport.Soccer Statistics Foundation

Ligue 2 seasons
France
2